Concurrent Euclid (ConEuc) is a concurrent descendant of the Euclid programming language designed by James Cordy and Ric Holt, then at the University of Toronto, in 1980.  ConEuc was designed for concurrent, high performance, highly reliable system software, such as operating systems, compilers and embedded microprocessor systems. The TUNIS operating system, a Unix variant, was implemented entirely in Concurrent Euclid. ConEuc extends a core subset of Euclid with  processes and monitors (as specified by C.A.R. Hoare) as well as language constructs needed for systems programming including separate compilation, variables at absolute addresses, type converters, long integers and other features.

ConEuc was implemented by a small (50k bytes), fast, portable compiler that was self-compiling and had replaceable code generators. High quality code generators for several computers, including the PDP-11, VAX-11, Motorola 68000 and Motorola 6809 were developed that produced code comparable to the best C compilers. Concurrent Euclid programs that used concurrency could be run on a bare machine (supported by a small assembly language kernel), or in simulated mode as an ordinary process running under an operating system.

The Turing programming language is a direct descendant of Concurrent Euclid and its Turing Plus variant eventually replaced ConEuc in most applications.

References
J.R. Cordy and R.C. Holt 1980. Specification of Concurrent Euclid. Technical reports CSRI-115 (July 1980) and CSRI-133 (August 1981), Computer Systems Research Institute, University of Toronto.  54 pages.
R.C. Holt 1982. Concurrent Euclid, the Unix System and Tunis. Addison-Wesley 1982.  323 pages.
R.C. Holt 1982. A short introduction to Concurrent Euclid. ACM SIGPLAN Notices 17, 5 (May. 1982), 60-79.
R.C. Holt 1982. Tunis: a Unix look-alike written in Concurrent Euclid. SIGOPS Operating Systems Review 16, 1 (January 1982), 4-5.

Concurrent programming languages